Diatraea veracruzana is a moth in the family Crambidae. It was described by Harold Edmund Box in 1956. It is found in Veracruz, Mexico.

References

Chiloini
Moths described in 1956